Drake Maye (born August 30, 2002) is an American football quarterback for the North Carolina Tar Heels.

High school career
Maye was born on August 30, 2002, in Charlotte, North Carolina. He attended and played high school football for Myers Park High School in Charlotte, where he was named MaxPreps North Carolina player of the year. He was a four-star prospect and originally committed to Alabama before flipping to North Carolina.

College career
Coming into his true freshman season third on the depth chart, Maye played little in 2021. He redshirted, appearing in four games over the course of the season, the maximum amount allowed for players desiring to keep their redshirt. When starter Sam Howell was injured and unable to play against Wofford, Maye saw the most extended action of his career to that point. Splitting halves with the other backup, Jacolby Criswell, Maye completed 7 of his 9 pass attempts for 89 yards and a touchdown, the first of his career. He also registered four carries for 38 yards.

2022
With Sam Howell leaving for the NFL, Maye and Criswell battled for the starting QB spot heading into the 2022 season. After what was described as a very close position battle, Maye won the job and was named the starter on August 22, 2022, five days before the week zero season opener. In his first career start against Florida A&M Maye completed 29/37 pass attempts for 294 yards and 5 touchdowns and rushed four times for 55 yards. Maye became the first Tar Heel quarterback to throw for five touchdowns in his first start. The next week, on the road against in-state foe App State, Maye threw for 352 yards and four touchdowns and added 76 yards and a touchdown on the ground in the Tar Heels' thrilling 63–61 victory. In week 2, Maye led the Tar Heels to another win, this time over Georgia State, passing for 284 yards and two touchdowns with a 79.2% completion percentage and 197.7 passer rating, both his highest of the season to date. After a bye week, Maye threw for 300 yards and five touchdowns against Notre Dame in a 45-32 loss at home. The next week, Maye and the Tar Heels responded well to their first loss of the season with a 45-10 blowout of Virginia Tech in Chapel Hill. He threw for 363 yards and three touchdowns and ran 13 times for 73 yards and two touchdowns. His 436 total yards were a season-high, as was his 94.8 QBR. 

Through five games Maye had the most total touchdowns (22) in program history and accounted for five total touchdowns in four of them. After the loss to Notre Dame, Maye led the Tar Heels to six straight wins and a 9-1 record through the first ten games of the season, clinching the ACC Coastal Division title with a come-from-behind 36–34 victory over rivals Wake Forest. In the division-clinching win, Maye threw for a season- and career-high 448 yards and three touchdowns, and added 71 rushing yards and a touchdown as well. His 519 total offensive yards were third most in a single game by a Tar Heel quarterback. The team would go on to finish the regular season 9–3 following back-to-back losses to Georgia Tech and NC State. The Tar Heels followed that up with another loss, to Atlantic Division champions Clemson, in the ACC Championship to move to 9–4. After the game, Maye shot down speculation that he might enter the transfer portal to chase potentially lucrative NIL deals.

In the Holiday Bowl loss against Oregon Maye completed 18/35 passes for 206 yards and three touchdowns, tying Sam Howell's single season passing TD record. The 28–27 loss to the Ducks extended UNC's season-ending losing streak to four games, and Maye finished his first full season as the starter with a 9–5 record.

His 4,321 passing yards in 2022 broke the school record for single season passing yards, previously held by Mitch Trubisky. His 39 career passing touchdowns put him seventh all-time in school history. Maye's 698 rushing yards on the season led the team as well, and he was second on the season (behind RB Elijah Green) for rushing touchdowns with 7. He finished 10th place in 2022 Heisman Trophy voting.

Statistics

Personal life
Maye's father, Mark, played quarterback for the Tar Heels from 1983 to 1987. His older brothers Luke and Cole were also college athletes. Luke played for the North Carolina basketball team from 2015 to 2019, and was a part of the 2017 national championship team, and Cole was a member of the University of Florida's 2017 National Championship baseball team as a pitcher. Another brother, Beau, walked on to the Tar Heel basketball team in 2022.

See also 

 North Carolina Tar Heels football statistical leaders

References

External links
North Carolina Tar Heels bio

American football quarterbacks
Living people
North Carolina Tar Heels football players
Players of American football from Charlotte, North Carolina
Sportspeople from Charlotte, North Carolina
2002 births